The 7th Biathlon European Championships were held in Zakopane, Poland, from January 26 to January 30, 2000.

There were total of 16 competitions held: sprint, pursuit, individual and relay both for U26 and U21.

Results

U26

Men's

Women's

U21

Men's

Women's

Medal table

External links 
 IBU full results
 All results

Biathlon European Championships
International sports competitions hosted by Poland
2000 in biathlon
2000 in Polish sport
Biathlon competitions in Poland